Abdulaziz Al-Aryani (born 13 February 1996) is a Saudi Arabian footballer who plays as a striker for Al-Riyadh.

Honours
Al-Ittihad
King Cup: 2018
Crown Prince Cup: 2016–17

External links

References

Living people
1996 births
Saudi Arabian footballers
Saudi Arabia youth international footballers
Ittihad FC players
Damac FC players
Al Batin FC players
Al-Riyadh SC players
Saudi Professional League players
Saudi First Division League players
Association football forwards